Kannithi Aviation Co. Ltd, operated as Kan Air, was a small airline with its hub at Chiang Mai Airport.  Kan Air operated charter and scheduled services in Thailand.  As of September 2016, Kan Air flew nine routes. Flights from Chiang Mai were to Mae Hong Son, Pai, Nan, Khon Kaen, Ubon Ratchathani, Phitsanulok, Hua Hin, Chiang Rai, and U-Tapao. 
On 21 April 2017, Kan Air suspended all of its operations.

History 
Kan Air, owned by Kannithi Aviation Company Limited, started operations on 24 September 2010.  It was founded by Captain Somphong Sooksanguan as president and Mrs Saychon Sibmong as CEO. On 8 July 2015, the airline was forced to suspend five routes for lack of compliance with airline operating licenses. The Kan Air suspension was lifted a few months later.

On 21 April 2017, Kan Air suspended all remaining flights due to "technical difficulties" with their last operational aircraft, a Cessna Grand Caravan 208B.

Destinations 
Kan Airlines operated charter and scheduled flight services with Cessna Grand Caravan C208B, Beechcraft Premier I, and ATR 72-500:

Domestic
From Chiang Mai – Chiang Mai International Airport (main hub)
 Bangkok – Don Mueang International Airport
 Hua Hin – Hua Hin Airport
 Khon Kaen – Khon Kaen Airport
 Mae Hong Son – Mae Hong Son Airport 
 Nan – Nan Nakhon Airport 
 Pai – Pai Airport
 Rayong – U-Tapao International Airport 
 Phitsanulok – Phitsanulok Airport 
 Ubon Ratchathani – Ubon Ratchathani Airport

Fleet 

As of November 2017, the Kan Air fleet consisted of the following aircraft:

Services

Scheduled flights
With its base in Don Mueang, Kan Air operated daily and weekly scheduled service to destinations in northern, northeastern, and central Thailand.

Charter flights
With its base at Don Muang International Airport, Kan Air provided a more direct route to the desired location than a commercial flight. Chartering a private jet allows passengers to fly on their schedule, fly to smaller airfields closer to their final destination, and avoid the queues and chaos of major airport terminals.

Medical evacuation service
Kan Air signed a memorandum of understanding (MOU) with National Institute of Emergency Medicine to transport critically ill patients.

References

External links

Defunct airlines of Thailand
Airlines established in 2010
Airlines disestablished in 2017
2010 establishments in Thailand
2017 disestablishments in Thailand
Companies based in Bangkok
Thai companies established in 2010